In mathematics, the Loch Ness monster is a surface with infinite genus but only one end. The surface can be constructed by starting with a plane (which can be thought of as the surface of Loch Ness) and adding an infinite number of handles (which can be thought of as loops of the Loch Ness monster).

See also
 Cantor tree surface
 Jacob's ladder surface

References

Surfaces
Loch Ness Monster